Duncan McNeill, 1st Baron Colonsay FRSE (20 August 1793 – 31 January 1874) was a Scottish advocate, judge and Tory politician. He was Lord Justice General and Lord President of the Court of Session between 1852 and 1867.

His younger brother was the physician and diplomat Sir John McNeill.

Background and education
McNeill was born on the island of Oronsay in the Inner Hebrides, the son of John McNeill (1767–1846), laird of Colonsay and Oronsay, and his wife Hester (née McNeill). Educated at St Andrew's University where he graduated MA in 1809..

He served his apprenticeship in Edinburgh under Michael Linning WS, based at 6 St James Square. He became a member of the Faculty of Advocates in 1816.  He was the presumptive father of philosopher Edmund Montgomery.

Political, legal and judicial career
He was Advocate Depute in Edinburgh 1820 to 1824.

MacNeill was appointed Sheriff of Perthshire in 1824. He served under Sir Robert Peel as Solicitor General for Scotland from 1834 to 1835 and again from 1841 to 1842 and as Lord Advocate from 1842 to 1846. From 1843 to 1851 he sat as Member of Parliament for Argyllshire. In 1851 he was appointed a Senator of the College of Justice and an Ordinary Lord of Session as Lord Colonsay and Oronsay. He was Lord Justice General and Lord President of the Court of Session from 1852 to 1867, and was raised to the peerage as Baron Colonsay, of Colonsay and Oronsay in the County of Argyll, on 26 February 1867.

Personal life

In 1829 he was elected a Fellow of the Royal Society of Edinburgh his proposer being John Shank More.

In later life Edinburgh University awarded him an honorary doctorate (LLD).

McNeill was unmarried, but lived in a very large Georgian townhouse: 73 Great King Street in Edinburgh's Second New Town.

He was a member of the Highland Society of Edinburgh (1833).

Lord Colonsay died at Pau, France, on 31 January 1874, aged 80, when the title became extinct.

He was interred at Warriston Cemetery in Edinburgh, south of the upper east–west path towards the East Gate. His bronze coat of arms has been stolen from the monument.

References

External links 

 

1793 births
1874 deaths
People from Oronsay
Alumni of the University of Edinburgh
Alumni of the University of St Andrews
Barons in the Peerage of the United Kingdom
Scottish sheriffs
Solicitors General for Scotland
Lord Advocates
Colonsay
Members of the Faculty of Advocates
Duncan
Members of the Parliament of the United Kingdom for Scottish constituencies
Scottish Tory MPs (pre-1912)
UK MPs 1841–1847
UK MPs 1847–1852
UK MPs who were granted peerages
Lords President of the Court of Session
Lords Justice-General
Fellows of the Royal Society of Edinburgh
Burials at Warriston Cemetery
19th-century Scottish medical doctors
Members of the Privy Council of the United Kingdom
Peers of the United Kingdom created by Queen Victoria